George Konig (January 26, 1856 – May 31, 1913) was a United States Congressman who represented Maryland's 3rd congressional district from 1911 to 1913.  He was a member of the Democratic Party.

Konig was born to George Konig (the 2nd) and Caroline Forrester Konig.  He grew up in Baltimore City, in the Fell's Point neighborhood, and obtained minimal schooling.  He worked as a shipyard caulker for several years, and eventually become the president of the ship caulker union and an official in District Assembly 41 of the Knights of Labor.

Konig moved to Norfolk, Virginia, for a time, but returned during an epidemic.  He worked for the Baltimore Chrome Works and later became a police officer.  He left the police force in 1881 and served as treasurer for the Ship Caulkers' Union for over 12 years.  He then went into the sewage business.

In 1884, Konig married Margaret Schroeder, and, over the next few years, they had four daughters: Mary (Carrie), Emma, Margaret, and Sarah (Sadie).  They also had a son named George (the fourth) and two adopted daughters.  Konig's father died of natural causes in 1892.

In 1895, Konig campaigned for the 1st branch of the Baltimore City Council and lost.  That same year, he and his family moved to the Canton neighborhood of Baltimore.  In May 1903, Konig won the first ward seat of the first branch of the city council, and was re-elected in 1905. Konig ran for a seat in the second branch in 1907, and won.  Much of this area was contained within Maryland's 3rd congressional district, which he would win election to in 1910 by unseating a Republican incumbent. He held the seat from March 4, 1911, until his death due to complications from pneumonia.  He is interred in Baltimore Cemetery.

See also
List of United States Congress members who died in office (1900–49)

References
Maryland Historical Magazine, Fall 2006, The Lost Lives of George Konig Sr.&Jr., A Father-Son Tale of Old Fell's Point

"Memorial services held in the House of Representatives of the United States, together with remarks presented in eulogy of George Konig, late a representative from Maryland frontispiece 1914"

American trade union leaders
1856 births
1913 deaths
Democratic Party members of the United States House of Representatives from Maryland
Baltimore City Council members
Deaths from pneumonia in Maryland
19th-century American politicians